Mike Lichten is an American football coach.  He is the head football coach at the University of New England in Biddeford, Maine. The school's football program begins play in 2017. Lichten was the head football coach at Becker College from 2011 to 2015. He is a native of Newton, Massachusetts, and graduated from the University of New Hampshire in 2008.

Head coaching record

References

External links
 New England profile

Year of birth missing (living people)
Living people
Becker Hawks football coaches
New England Nor'easters football coaches
Northeastern Huskies football coaches
University of New Hampshire alumni
Sportspeople from Newton, Massachusetts
Coaches of American football from Massachusetts